This list of United States natural disasters is a list of notable natural disasters that occurred in the United States after 1816. Due to inflation, the monetary damage estimates are not comparable. Unless otherwise noted, the year given is the year in which the currency's valuation was calculated. References can be found in the associated articles noted.

See also
 List of disasters in the United States by death toll
 List of wildfires in the United States
 :Category:Lists of tropical cyclones in the United States

References 

Natural